Old Lexington is an unincorporated community in Stone County, Arkansas, United States. The Joe Guffey House, which is listed on the National Register of Historic Places, is located in Old Lexington.

References

Unincorporated communities in Stone County, Arkansas
Unincorporated communities in Arkansas